Pedro Martínez Aquino (born November 29, 1968), commonly but inaccurately referred to as Pedro A. Martínez (to distinguish him from the more famous Pedro Jaime Martínez), is a Dominican former Major League Baseball pitcher.

Career
He was an effective reliever for the San Diego Padres in 1993 and 1994, but after being part of the 11-player trade between the Padres and the Houston Astros after the 1994 season (in which he, Derek Bell, Doug Brocail, Ricky Gutiérrez, Phil Plantier, and Craig Shipley went to the Astros for Ken Caminiti, Andújar Cedeño, Steve Finley, Robert Petagine, Brian Williams, and minor league player Sean Fesh), he was never effective with the Astros in 1995.  He spent the next two seasons with the New York Mets and the Cincinnati Reds, pitching only a handful of major league games without ever regaining his success with the Padres.  He finished his career with a 3.97 earned run average in 142⅔ innings.

References

External links

1968 births
Living people
Cincinnati Reds players
Dominican Republic expatriate baseball players in the United States

Houston Astros players
Major League Baseball players from the Dominican Republic
Major League Baseball pitchers
New York Mets players
People from Santo Domingo Norte
San Diego Padres players
Charleston Rainbows players
Dominican Republic expatriate baseball players in Mexico
Guerreros de Oaxaca players
Indianapolis Indians players
Las Vegas Stars (baseball) players
Norfolk Tides players
Piratas de Campeche players
Spokane Indians players
Toledo Mud Hens players
Tucson Toros players
Wichita Wranglers players
Tigres de Quintana Roo players